China Resources Vanguard, doing business as China Resources Vanguard Shop or Vanguard, operates the supermarket chains of China Resources. It is the third-largest supermarket chain in Hong Kong. As of 31 December 2014, there are 4866 shops operating in Hong Kong and the mainland Chinese provinces / municipalities of Guangdong, Zhejiang, Jiangsu, Shanghai, Tianjin and Beijing.

According to market research firm EuroMonitor estimates in 2012, China Resources Vanguard supermarket market share in Hong Kong is about 7.8%. Wellcome Hong Kong's market share is about 39.8% and PARKnSHOP Hong Kong's market share is about 33.1%.

On 18 August 2013, China Resources Enterprise's supermarket chain Vanguard and British supermarket Tesco signed a "memorandum of understanding", intending to set up a joint venture interest group in mainland China, Hong Kong and Macau, operating hypermarkets, supermarkets, convenience stores, liquor stores and cash and carry businesses. China Resources Enterprise took an 80% share and Tesco took a 20% share.

History
1984: China Resources Supermarket (CR Supermarket), former name of China Resources Vanguard, was founded.
1991: CR Supermarket opened its first store in Mainland China.
2001: China Resources acquired a 72% stake in Shenzhen Vanguard Super Department Store. China Resources Supermarket merged with Shenzhen Vanguard Super Department Store.
2002: China Resources fully acquired Shenzhen Vanguard Super Department Store and renamed it as China Resources Vanguard Shop.
 2005: Introduction of new sunflower logo.
 2007: China Resources Holdings acquired Tianjin company China Resources Supermarket Chain.
 2010: The first blt boutique supermarket opened.
 2012: Vanguard launched new brand "V+ urban boutique supermarkets".
 2013: Set up joint venture with Tesco.
 2015: Sale of supermarket business to improve the performance of China Resources Enterprise. Opened first U Select by Tesco store in Hong Kong.

Brands

Hong Kong 
 Vanguard - standard supermarkets
 VanGO - convenience stores
 U Select - stores with at least one third Tesco products
 Voi_la! - wine cellar

China 
 Vanguard - standard supermarkets
 VanGO - convenience stores
 V+ - upmarket urban boutique supermarket aimed at China's growing middle class
 blt - upmarket supermarket with a focus on fresh food, styled as a farm market
 blt Express - smaller blt stores
 Ole' - upmarket supermarket with a focus on imported food
 乐购express - former Tesco Express stores
 Voi_la! - wine cellar

References

External links

CR Vanguard (China) (in English)
CR Vanguard (China) (in Chinese)
CR Vanguard (Hong Kong) (in Chinese)

China Resources
Convenience stores of China
Department stores of Hong Kong
Government-owned companies of China
Retail companies established in 1984
Supermarkets of China
Supermarkets of Hong Kong